Dungeon Tac Cards is a supplement for fantasy role-playing games published by Judges Guild in 1976.

Contents
Dungeon Tac Cards is a player's aid: 140 weapon, equipment, and action cards, each with appropriate rules and descriptions from Original D&D. The cards are intended to be placed in front of the player during the game to act as a reference and to indicate what equipment the PC is using.

Publication history
Dungeon Tac Cards was published by Judges Guild in 1976 as 140 cardstock cards.

Shortly after Gen Con IX, the first subscribers to Judges Guild's subscription format got their Initial Package (1976) in a plain, unmarked large envelope containing loose leaf sheets and stapled booklets. The Initial Package was most notable for Bill Owen's Dungeon Tac Cards (1976), one of the first Dungeons & Dragons references of any sort by another company. According to author Shannon Appelcline, "these combat action cards are similar to those used much more recently by Dungeons & Dragons 4th Edition (2008) and Warhammer Fantasy Roleplay 3rd Edition (2009). They contain info for lots of weapons and even new combat tactics like 'jump' and 'punch.'" Judges Guild started selling Dungeon Tac Cards to stores in 1977.

Reception
 Don Turnbull reviewed TAC Cards for White Dwarf #3. Turnbull commented: "A very comprehensive set, therefore. However I am ambivalent about the merits of using these cards. I wonder whether their use would over-regularise play of D&D and make it mechanically more dull? [...] Providing the DM is flexible and permits some 'human error' (in the heat of battle it is understandable if a player forgets to turn his card) I think they could be valuable."

References

Judges Guild fantasy role-playing game supplements
Role-playing game supplements introduced in 1976